The 1940–41 Ohio Bobcats men's basketball team represented Ohio University in the college basketball season of 1940–41. The team was coached by Dutch Trautwein and played their home games at the Men's Gymnasium.  The team finished the regular season 16–3 and was invited to the 1941 National Invitation Tournament.  There they defeated  Duquesne and City College of New York before losing to Long Island in the NIT final. Ohio's Frank Baumholtz was the NIT Most valuable player.

Schedule

|-
!colspan=9 style=| Regular Season

|-
!colspan=9 style=| National Invitation Tournament

 Source:

References

Ohio Bobcats men's basketball seasons
Ohio
1940 in sports in Ohio
1941 in sports in Ohio